Interpleural block is a medical procedure in which a local anesthetic is injected into the thoracic cage between the parietal and visceral pleura.

References
 
 

Anesthesia
Regional anesthesia
Surgical procedures and techniques